Whooping Creek is a stream in the U.S. state of Georgia. It is a tributary to the Chattahoochee River.

The name "Whooping Creek" is a preservation of its native Creek language name weturncau ("rumbling water").

References

Rivers of Georgia (U.S. state)
Rivers of Carroll County, Georgia